Sydney Keepa Jackson (18 December 1938 – 3 September 2007) was a prominent Māori activist, trade unionist and leader.

Biography
Jackson, of Ngāti Kahungunu and Ngāti Porou descent, was born on 18 December 1938, and educated at Nelson College from 1952 to 1956. He first came to prominence at the University of Auckland, where he gained an MA. He was the chairman of the Māori Students Association, and then was a founder of Ngā Tamatoa. He was strongly involved in supporting Tino Rangatiratanga, the revival of the Māori language, and the Māori protest movement in general.

He was the son of the All Black Everard Jackson, and grandson of New Zealand national rugby league team representative Frederick Stanley Jackson. He played representative rugby union for Wellington in 1959 and 1960, and was a New Zealand Māori trialist. He was active from 1968 against apartheid, particularly New Zealand tours of South Africa.

In the 1970s Jackson was one of the founding members of Ngā Tamatoa, a Maori activist group. During this period he and Ngā Tamatoa were influenced by the works of the American Black Panther Party members such as Eldridge Cleaver and Stokely Carmichael. He stood unsuccessfully for the Auckland City Council on the Labour Party ticket at the 1977 local election. Polling poorly, he finished fourth to last.

Jackson was deeply involved in the trade union movement in the 1980s, as a field officer and then as secretary of the Clerical Workers Union for 17 years.

He was also the chairperson of Te Kupenga o Hoturoa – the first Māori sponsored primary healthcare organisation; a Director of Te Roopu Huihuinga Hauora, a Māori healthcare organisation, and built up Turuki Healthcare as its CEO.

Jackson was first married to the late Hana Te Hemara, and was survived by his second wife Deirdre Nehua and his eight children. He was the brother of Moana Jackson.

References

External links
Poroporoaki: Syd Jackson
Union movement pays tribute to Syd Jackson
Tributes paid to Maori activist Jackson

1938 births
2007 deaths
New Zealand trade unionists
Ngāti Kahungunu people
Ngāti Porou people
University of Auckland alumni
Māori activists
New Zealand people of Cornish descent
Māori language revivalists
People educated at Nelson College
Wellington rugby union players
20th-century New Zealand politicians
Syd
New Zealand Labour Party politicians